Sascha Schulz (born 19 July 1972 in Mamer, Luxembourg) is a Luxembourgian dressage rider. He represented Luxembourg at the 2014 World Equestrian Games in Normandy and at 2015 European Dressage Championships in Aachen.

His current best championship result is 14th place in team dressage at 2015 European Championships while his current best individual result is 56th place achieved at the same championships.

References

Living people
1972 births
Luxembourgian male equestrians
Luxembourgian dressage riders
People from Mamer